"Prayer in C" is a song by French folk pop duo Lilly Wood and the Prick, originally released on their album Invincible Friends in 2010.

In 2014, German DJ and record producer Robin Schulz remixed the song, and the remix was re-released in June 2014. He used a CD of Invincible Friends as the source, and initially made his remix available as a free download, to the consternation of the copyright owners, Wagram Music.

The Schulz remix topped the French Singles Chart. Outside France, the remix of "Prayer in C" topped the charts in Austria, Belgium, the Czech Republic, Denmark, Finland, Schulz's native Germany, Greece, Hungary, Italy, Luxembourg, Norway, Poland, Portugal, the Republic of Ireland, Romania, Spain, Sweden, Switzerland and the United Kingdom, peaked within the top ten in Australia and New Zealand and peaked within in the top 40 of the charts in Brazil, Canada and the United States. In September 2014, Kiesza covered the song in Live Lounge on BBC Radio 1 in the United Kingdom.

Formats and track listings
 Digital download
 "Prayer in C" (Robin Schulz Radio Edit) – 3:09
 CD single
 "Prayer in C" (Robin Schulz Radio Edit) – 3:09
 "Prayer in C" (Robin Schulz Remix) – 5:22
 Digital download – 5th anniversary rework
 "Prayer in C" (Robin Schulz radio edit) – 3:09
 "Prayer in C" (5th anniversary remix) – 2:59
 "Prayer in C" (VIP remix) – 2:44

Charts

Original version

Weekly charts

Year-end charts

Remix

Weekly charts

Year-end charts

Decade-end charts

Certifications

Release history

See also

 List of number-one hits of 2014 (Austria)
 List of number-one hits of 2014 (Denmark)
 List of number-one singles of 2014 (Finland)
 List of number-one hits of 2014 (France)
 List of number-one hits of 2014 (Germany)
 List of number-one singles of 2014 (Ireland)
 List of number-one singles of 2014 (Netherlands)
 List of number-one hits of 2014 (Norway)
 List of number-one singles of 2014 (Poland)
 List of number-one hits of 2014 (Scotland)
 List of number-one singles of 2014 (Sweden)
 List of UK Dance Chart number-one singles of 2014
 List of UK Singles Chart number ones of the 2010s

References

External links
 Full Lyrics at LyricsOnDemand.com

2010 songs
2014 singles
Dutch Top 40 number-one singles
Irish Singles Chart number-one singles
Number-one singles in Austria
Number-one singles in Denmark
Number-one singles in Finland
SNEP Top Singles number-one singles
Number-one singles in Germany
Number-one singles in Greece
Number-one singles in Hungary
Number-one singles in Israel
Number-one singles in Italy
Number-one singles in Norway
Number-one singles in Poland
Number-one singles in Russia
Number-one singles in Scotland
Number-one singles in Sweden
Number-one singles in Switzerland
UK Singles Chart number-one singles
Ultratop 50 Singles (Flanders) number-one singles
Ultratop 50 Singles (Wallonia) number-one singles
Songs against racism and xenophobia
Anti-war songs
Protest songs
Robin Schulz songs
Songs critical of religion
Songs with feminist themes
Songs about homelessness
Songs about old age
Songs about poverty
Tropical house songs
Warner Music Group singles